A list of films produced by the Marathi language film industry based in Maharashtra in the year 1961.

1961 Releases
A list of Marathi films released in 1961.

References

Lists of 1961 films by country or language
 Marathi
1961